Cor van Nus (29 May 1905 – 9 August 1980) was a Dutch footballer. He played in one match for the Netherlands national football team in 1926.

References

External links
 

1905 births
1980 deaths
Dutch footballers
Netherlands international footballers
Place of birth missing
Association footballers not categorized by position